Baham may refer to:

Baham, Cameroon, a town in Cameroon
Baham, a name of the star Theta Pegasi
USS Baham (AG-71), a ship named for the star
Baham language, a Papuan language spoken on the Bomberai Peninsula